Longzhou primarily refers to Longzhou County (龙州县), Guangxi Zhuang Autonomous Region, People's Republic of China.

Longzhou may also refer to:

Longzhou Zhuang language, branch of the Zhuang language
Longzhou Grape, grown in that county
Dragon boat (龙舟), basis of the Chinese sport dragon boat racing
Longzhou, Guangxi (龙州镇), town in Longzhou County
Longzhou, Hebei (龙州镇)